The 1619 Project: A New Origin Story is a 2021 anthology of essays and poetry, published by Random House's One World imprint on November 16, 2021. It is a book-length expansion of the essays presented in the 1619 Project issue of The New York Times Magazine in August 2019. The book was created by Nikole Hannah-Jones and The New York Times Magazine, and is edited by Hannah-Jones, Caitlin Roper, Ilena Silverman and Jake Silverstein.

On January 26, 2023, The 1619 Project documentary television series based on the original project and book debuted on Hulu.

Contents 
 Preface: "Origins" by Nikole Hannah-Jones
 "The White Lion", poem by Claudia Rankine
 "Democracy" by Nikole Hannah-Jones
 "Daughters of Azimuth", poem by Nikky Finney
 "Loving Me", poem by Vievee Francis
 "Race" by Dorothy Roberts
 "Conjured", poem by Honorée Fanonne Jeffers
 "A Ghazalled Sentence After "My People...Hold On" by Eddie Kendricks and the Negro Act of 1740", poem by Terrance Hayes
 "Sugar" by Khalil Gibran Muhammad
 "First to Rise", poem by Yusef Komunyakaa
 "proof [dear Phillis]", poem by Eve L. Ewing
 "Fear" by Leslie Alexander and Michelle Alexander
 "Freedom Is Not for Myself Alone", fiction by Robert Jones, Jr.
 "Other Persons", poem by Reginald Dwayne Betts
 "Dispossession" by Tiya Miles
 "Trouble the Water", fiction by Barry Jenkins
 "Sold South", fiction by Jesmyn Ward
 "Capitalism" by Matthew Desmond
 "Fort Mose", poem by Tyehimba Jess
 "Before His Execution", poem by Tim Seibles
 "Politics" by Jamelle Bouie
 "We as People", poem by Cornelius Eady
 "A Letter to Harriet Hayden", monologue by Lynn Nottage
 "Citizenship" by Martha S. Jones
 "The Camp", fiction by Darryl Pinckney
 "An Absolute Massacre", fiction by ZZ Packer
 "Self-defense" by Carol Anderson
 "Like to the Rushing of a Mighty Wind", poem by Tracy K. Smith
 "no car for colored [+] ladies (or, miss wells goes off [on] the rails)", poem by Evie Shockley
 "Punishment" by Bryan Stevenson
 "Race Riot", poem by Forrest Hamer
 "Greenwood", poem by Jasmine Mans
 "Inheritance" by Trymaine Lee
 "The New Negro", poem by A. Van Jordan
 "Bad Blood", fiction by Yaa Gyasi
 "Medicine" by Linda Villarosa
 "1955", poem by Danez Smith
 "From Behind the Counter", fiction by Terry McMillan
 "Church" by Anthea Butler
 "Youth Sunday", poem by Rita Dove
 "On "Brevity"", poem by Camille T. Dungy
 "Music" by Wesley Morris
 "Quotidian", poem by Natasha Trethewey
 "The Panther Is a Virtual Animal", poem by Joshua Bennett
 "Healthcare" by Jeneen Interlandi
 "Unbought, Unbossed, Unbothered", fiction by Nafissa Thompson-Spires
 "Crazy When You Smile", poem by Patricia Smith
 "Traffic" by Kevin M. Kruse
 "Rainbows Aren't Real, Are They?", fiction by Kiese Laymon
 "A Surname to Honor Their Mother", poem by Gregory Pardlo
 "Progress" by Ibram X. Kendi
 "At the Superdome After the Storm Has Passed", poem by Clint Smith
 "Mother and Son", fiction by Jason Reynolds
 "Justice" by Nikole Hannah-Jones
 "Progress Report", poem by Sonia Sanchez

Reception 
Numerous historians criticized the book for factual and historical inaccuracies, inconsistency, or exaggeration. The most frequent issue historians take issue with is that Hannah-Jones claims "...that the patriots fought the American Revolution in large part to preserve slavery in North America."; a claim that is contested by historians as not holding up to a review of the historical record.

The book debuted at number one on The New York Times nonfiction best-seller list for the week ending November 20, 2021.

See also 
 The 1619 Project: Born on the Water

References 

2021 anthologies
2021 non-fiction books
2021 poetry books
Books about African-American history
African-American literature
American anthologies
Books about race and ethnicity
Essay anthologies
American poetry anthologies
Non-fiction books about American slavery
One World (imprint) books
Thirteen Colonies
Works about British history